Sar Kamar (also known as Sar Kamareh) is a village in Barez Rural District, Manj District, Lordegan County, Chaharmahal and Bakhtiari Province, Iran. At the 2006 census, its population was 160, in 27 families.

References 

Populated places in Lordegan County